The China Air Task Force (CATF) was a combat organization of the United States Army Air Forces created in July 1942 under the command of Brig. Gen. Claire Chennault, after the Flying Tigers of the 1st American Volunteer Group of the Chinese Air Force were disbanded on 4 July of that year. It consisted of the 23rd Fighter Group with four squadrons, the assigned 74th, 75th, 76th, and attached 16th Fighter Squadrons, plus the 11th Bombardment Squadron. It was a subordinate unit of the Tenth Air Force in India, commanded by Brig. Gen. Earl Naiden and (from 18 August 1942) by Maj. Gen. Clayton Bissell. "Chennault had no respect for Bissell as a combat airman," wrote his biographer Martha Byrd, and "Bissell had no respect for Chennault as an administrator." Their relationship, she wrote, was ugly.

On 19 March 1943, the CATF was disbanded and replaced by the Fourteenth Air Force, with Chennault, now a major general, in command. In the nine months of its existence, the China Air Task Force had been credited with shooting down 149 Japanese planes, plus 85 probables, with a loss of only 16 P-40s. It had flown 65 bombing missions against Japanese targets in China, Burma and Indochina, dropping 311 tons of bombs and losing only one B-25 bomber.

See also
 Development of Chinese Nationalist air force (1937–1945)
 Eagle Squadrons, American volunteers in the RAF during World War II

Notes

References

 Byrd, Martha. Chennault: Giving Wings to the Tiger (Tuscaloosa: University of Alabama Press, 1987)
 Ford, Daniel. Flying Tigers: Claire Chennault and His American Volunteers (New York: HarperCollins, 2007)
 Bright, Charles, ed. Historical Dictionary of the U.S. Air Force (New York: Greenwood Press, 1992)

Military units and formations of the United States Army Air Forces
Military task forces
Military units and formations established in 1942
Military units and formations disestablished in 1943
Ad hoc units and formations of the United States
China–United States military relations